Adam Banaś (born 25 December 1982 in Bytom) is a Polish professional footballer who last played for Simurq as a defender.

Career

Club
In January 2009, Banaś signed a contract with Górnik Zabrze.

In the summer of 2014, Banaś signed a one-year contract with Simurq in the Azerbaijan Premier League.

References

External links
 

1982 births
Living people
Sportspeople from Bytom
Polish footballers
Piast Gliwice players
Górnik Zabrze players
Zagłębie Lubin players
Simurq PIK players
Association football defenders
Polish expatriate sportspeople in Azerbaijan
Expatriate footballers in Azerbaijan
Azerbaijan Premier League players